The Daimler-Mercedes M836 engine is a naturally-aspirated and supercharged, 3.9-liter to 4.0-liter, straight-6, internal combustion piston engine, designed, developed and produced by Mercedes-Benz, in partnership with Daimler; between 1924 and 1929.

M836 engine
The six-cylinder in-line 3920 cc engine featured an overhead camshaft which at the time was an unusual feature, with “bevel linkage”. However, it was the switchable supercharger (”Kompressor”), adopted from the company's racing cars, that attracted most of the attention.

The top speed listed was 105 km/h (65 mph) or 112 km/h (70 mph) according to which of the two offered final drive ratios was fitted.

Applications
Mercedes 15/70/100 PS

References

Mercedes-Benz engines
Straight-six engines
Engines by model
Gasoline engines by model